The Palau Football Association is the governing body for association football in Palau. The association is based in the town of Koror. Palau currently is not a member of the Oceania Football Confederation (OFC), the Asian Football Federation (AFC), or FIFA.

The Association runs the national football team and the Palau Soccer League, as well as the Palau Youth Soccer League.

Organization
The Palau Football Association (PFA) was incorporated on May 28, 2002 under the laws of the Republic of Palau as a non-profit corporation. It is one of 14 federations of the Palau National Olympic Committee (PNOC). There is a small volunteer board that is primarily responsible to conduct all the activities of the association along with a handful of volunteer parent/coaches. (From the PFA website)

Regional affiliation
After its creation the PFA was listed as an associate member of the OFC. Subsequently this status was lost and has not been regained as of 2021.

In 2009 the PFA requested to become a quasi-member of the East Asia Football Federation. As of 2013, no further progress has been made.

See also
Football in Palau
List of football clubs in Palau

References

External links
Official website

National members of the Oceania Football Confederation
Football in Palau
Sports organizations established in 2002